Kushal Punjabi (23 April 1977 – 26 December 2019) was an Indian film and television actor.

Punjabi had been in movies such as Farhan Akhtar's Lakshya, Karan Johar's Kaal, UTV's Dhan Dhana Dhan Goal, and Cinevistaa's Sssshhh.... He had also appeared in a number of television series, most recently in Ishq Mei Marjawan on Colors TV, where he plays an advocate. In addition, he has participated in several reality shows, including Fear Factor, Mr. & Miss TV, Paisa Bhari Padega, Nautica Navigators Challenge, Ek Se Badhkar Ek, and Jhalak Dikhhla Jaa.

He had been a professional modern jazz and hip hop dancer and choreographed the Gladrags Manhunt Megamodel and Mrs. India contests as well as various fashion shows and music videos. He choreographed and directed the 'Star Walk' Fashion event for UMEED (a NGO for children).

Early life and family
Punjabi was born on 23 April 1977 into a Sindhi family. His father is from Karachi, his mother is from Hyderabad, and he was born and raised in Mumbai. As a child, Punjabi was extremely active and started cycling, skating, swimming and dancing very early.  In the coming years he played football, and swam for his school and college. He loved travelling and being outdoors, and his spirit of adventure made him an apt candidate for adventure sports which he did with great passion. His love of dance theatre and music helped him in becoming a serious actor, and he went on to do more than 20 TV shows, 5 films, and numerous music videos and commercials.

Career
He started his career as a dancer and model, and participated in Gladrags Manhunt Contest, in 2000. He also appeared in the music album of Shweta Shetty pop song Deewane To Deewane Hai in 1997. His television career began with the TV series A Mouthful Of Sky in 1995 for DD Metro channel, followed by Love Marriage in 2002 on Zee TV, and also appeared in a number of series like Don in 2006 for Star One, Santaan from 2007–2008 for Star Plus, Kasamh se in 2006 for Zee TV, Sssshh...Phir Koi Hain for Star One and King Aasman Ka Ek Raja for Sony TV. He appeared as Sub-inspector in CID: Special Bureau, detective-crime TV series, CID (on Sony TV) from 2003 to 2004 and had a small role in the TV series, Kkusum. In 2004, he appeared as a lead in Dekho Magar Pyaar Se (on STAR Plus), an Indian adaptation of popular Venezuelan TV series, Mi Gorda Bella and also in popular comedy TV series, Kabhi Haan Kabhi Naa on Zee TV. His other shows were Antariksh in 2008 for Star Plus, Yeh Dil Chahe More in 2006 for Star One, Hum Tum in 2008 for Zee Next and Rishta dot com on Sony TV in 2010 for Yash Raj productions. He also appeared in STAR Plus TV series, Raja Ki Aayegi Baraat from 2008 to 2010. In 2010, he did a cameo in SAB TV's Gutur Gu, India's first silent comedy series. He then bagged a prominent role in Cinevista's Sssshhh..., Farhan Akhtar's film, Lakshya (2004), followed by Karan Johar's Kaal, which also starred Ajay Devgn.

He appeared in Hindi films, like Sssshhh... (2003) Lakshya (2004), Kaal (2005), Salaam-e-Ishq: A Tribute to Love (2007) and Dhan Dhana Dhan Goal (2007).

He was a trained dancer-choreographer and worked as a dancer/trainer with Shiamak Davar for while. He participated in reality shows like Mr. & Ms. TV (2007), Fear Factor, Fun on the Run and Ek Se Badhkar Ek (2008) on Zee TV, and in 2011 won the TV reality game show Zor Ka Jhatka, the Indian version of Wipeout!, which started with 28 contestants, in an obstacle course set in Argentina, and was hosted by Shah Rukh Khan, and was shooting for Balaji Film's Rock the Shaadi as 1 of the 3 main leads. He also made a wild card entry in the dance reality show Jhalak Dikhhla Jaa.

Death
Punjabi was found dead at his residence in Bandra, Mumbai on 26 December 2019. The cause of death was reported to be suicide by hanging. He died at the age of 42. He was suffering from depression. Before dying by suicide, he distributed his property among his parents and son, as stated in his suicide note.

Filmography

Film

Television

Web series

References

External links
 
 

1977 births
2019 deaths
Indian male film actors
Male actors in Hindi cinema
Indian male television actors
Participants in Indian reality television series
Contestants on Indian game shows
Reality show winners
Male actors from Mumbai
Indian male soap opera actors
20th-century Indian male actors
21st-century Indian male actors
Sindhi people
Suicides by hanging in India
2019 suicides
Artists who committed suicide